Kashif Ibrahim (born 16 November 1977) is a former Pakistani cricketer.  Ibrahim was a right-handed batsman who bowled right-arm medium pace.  He was born at Karachi, Sindh Province.

Ibrahim made his first-class debut for Karachi Whites against Rawalpindi in 1996/97 season.  Ibrahim represented Karachi Whites in 17 first-class matches, Karachi in a single and Karachi Blues in 3.  He also represented Pakistan National Shipping Corporation in 9 first-class matches between 1999/00.  In final first-class match came in the 2000/01 season for Karachi Whites against Rawalpindi.  In total, from 1996/97 to 2000/01 he played 30 first-class matches.  In these matches he scored a total of 447 runs at a batting average of 16.44, with high score of 48.  With the ball he took 74 wickets at a bowling average of 27.14, with 5 five wicket hauls, one of which resulted in his best figures of 5/25.

Ibrahim also made his debut in List A cricket for Karachi Blues in the 1996/97 season against Bahawalpur.  Ibrahim represented the 3 Karachi teams in List A cricket 11 times from the 1996/97 to 1998/99 season.  In addition, he also represented Pakistan National Shipping Corporation in 4 matches during the 1999/00 season.  His final List-A match in Pakistan came for the Corporation against Pakistan International Airlines in September 1999.  During the 2000 English cricket season, Ibrahim played a 2 List A matches for the Sussex Cricket Board in the 2000 NatWest Trophy against Herefordshire. and Berkshire, which marked his final List A match.  In his total of 17 List A matches, he scored 226 runs at an average of 45.20, with a 2 half centuries and a high score of 63.  With the ball he took 22 wickets at an average of 28.45, with a best figures of 3/28.

References

External links
Kashif Ibrahim at Cricinfo
Kashif Ibrahim at CricketArchive

1977 births
Living people
Cricketers from Karachi
People from Sindh
Pakistani cricketers
Karachi cricketers
Pakistan National Shipping Corporation cricketers
Sussex Cricket Board cricketers
Karachi Blues cricketers
Karachi Whites cricketers